Colonel William Anderson McNulty (September 29, 1910 – January 25, 2005) was a decorated officer of the United States of America during World War II.

Early years

McNulty was born on September 29, 1910, in Roanoke, Virginia, as a son of Charles See McNulty, Sr. and his wife Anna Aylett. He attended Jefferson High School and then enrolled the United States Military Academy at West Point, New York, and graduated in summer 1932. He was commissioned a second lieutenant in the infantry and was assigned to the 29th Infantry Regiment at Fort Benning, Georgia.

World War II

During the War, McNulty served as a battalion commander of then Lt. Gen., later, full General George S. Patton's Third United States Army command. It was Lt. Col. McNulty's command, the 3rd Battalion, 301st Infantry Regiment of the Third Army's 94th Division, that in face of withering defensive artillery, tank, antitank and machine gun fire and with McNulty heroically at its head, forded in the dead of winter on February 23, 1945 the icy and swollen Saar River in southwest Germany at the then Siegfried Line to become the first Third Army troops to enter upon German soil, seizing the east bank German city of Serrig and establishing the vital bridgehead, which the balance of the Third Army used to sweep into the German Saarland, thereafter, taking the German cities of Trier, Coblenz, Bingen, Worms, Mainz, Kaiserslautern and Ludwigshafen, while killing or wounding 99,000 German troops and capturing another 140,112 of them, which represented virtually all of the remnants of the German First Army and the German Seventh Army.

Third Army command decided that the 3rd  Battalion, 301st Infantry Regiment would establish the bridgehead from Serrig, but intelligence could provide  very little information on enemy dispositions. Not to be deterred, William McNulty himself secretly reconnoitered the proposed Saar crossing and enemy positions the night prior to the 3rd /301st 's assault upon the German positions. The following day the troops of the 3rd/301st, again, in face of withering defensive fire and with their commander Lt. Col. McNulty, exposed at their lead, inspiring and directing them, forded the Saar River to attack and capture the city of Serrig, Germany. For his actions at the Saar on February 23, 1945, Lt. Col. William  A. McNulty was awarded both the Legion of Merit and the Silver Star.

Medals and decorations

Here are some medals and decorations of Colonel McNulty:

External links

References

1910 births
2005 deaths
People from Roanoke, Virginia
United States Army personnel of World War II
United States Military Academy alumni
United States Army Command and General Staff College alumni
United States Army officers
Recipients of the Silver Star
Recipients of the Legion of Merit
Chevaliers of the Légion d'honneur
Recipients of the Croix de Guerre 1939–1945 (France)
Recipients of the Czechoslovak War Cross